St Wilfrid's Church, Screveton is a Grade I listed parish church in the Church of England in Screveton.

History
The church dates from the 13th century. The west tower, however, dates from the 15th century and was altered in the late 16th century. The chancel was restored in 1881, and the nave restored and vestry built in 1884. The alabaster tomb of one Richard Whalley bears carvings of his three consecutive wives and his 24 children.

The church forms a joint parish with St Mary's Church, Car Colston. They form two of the Fosse group of churches with St Peter's Church, East Bridgford, St Helen's Church, Kneeton, and the Church of St Augustine of Canterbury, Flintham. Some joint services are held with the East Bridgford Methodist Church.

Memorials

Richard Whalley, Tower chamber
Walter Penistone Whalley, 1680
Margaret Whalley, 1675
Admiral Evelyn Sutton, 1817, and Roosilia Sutton, 1829.

References

Church of England church buildings in Nottinghamshire
Grade I listed churches in Nottinghamshire
Diocese of Southwell and Nottingham